Jacoby is a surname.

People with the surname Jacoby
 Arnold Jacoby (1913–2002), Norwegian writer and translator
 Brook Jacoby (born 1959), American baseball player
 Charles H. Jacoby Jr. (born 1954), United States Army general
 Dave Jacoby (powerlifter), American powerlifter
 David Jacoby (politician) (born 1956), American politician
 Don Jacoby (1920–1992), American trumpeter and teacher
 Dustin Jacoby (born 1988), American martial artist
 Erich Jacoby (1885–1941), Estonian architect
 Felix Jacoby (1876–1959), German classicist and philologist
 Georg Jacoby (1883–1964), German film director and screenwriter, son of Wilhelm Jacoby
 Hans Jacoby (1904–1963), German screenwriter
 Hans Jacoby (art director) (1898–1967), German set designer
 Hansjörg Jacoby, German curler
 Harold Jacoby (1865–1932), American astronomer
 Heinrich Jacoby (1889–1964), German educator
 James Jacoby (1933–1991), American bridge player (as Jim) and writer, son of Oswald Jacoby
 James Alfred Jacoby (1852–1909), British businessman and Liberal politician.
 Jean Jacoby (1891–1936), Luxembourgian artist
 Jeff Jacoby (disambiguation), several people
 Jim Jacoby, American businessman and real estate developer
 Joe Jacoby (born 1959), American football player
 Johann Jacoby (1805–1877), Prussian politician
 Lex Jacoby (1930–2015), Luxembourgian writer
 Louis Jacoby (born 1942), Norwegian singer and writer
 Lydia Jacoby (born 2004), American swimmer and Olympic medalist
 Mark Jacoby (born 1947), American singer and stage performer
 Martin Jacoby (1842–1907), German musician and entomologist
 Mathieson Jacoby (1869–1915), Australian politician
 Max Jacoby (born 1977), Luxembourgian film director and screenwriter
 Neil H. Jacoby (1909–1979), economist
 Oren Jacoby (born 1956), American director
 Oswald Jacoby (1902–1984), American bridge player
 Peter Jacoby, German curler
 Russell Jacoby (born 1945), American historian
 Susan Jacoby (born 1945), American author
 Tamar Jacoby (born 1954), American writer and academic
 Wilhelm Jacoby (1855–1925), German playwright, father of Georg Jacoby
 Antarctica's Jacoby Glacier is named for William J. Jacoby

Fictional character
 Lawrence Jacoby, character in the television series Twin Peaks

See also 
 Jacoby (disambiguation)
 Jacobi (disambiguation)
 Jacobi (surname)

de:Jacoby
nl:Jacoby
pt:Jacoby
Surnames from given names